Karawaan is a 1985 Pakistani television series written by Abdul-Qadir Junejo and directed by Iqbal Ansari. It is based on the life Sindhi folk singer Fozia Soomro.

Synopsis 
The story revolves around Sukhaan a Thari folk singer. During the warm weather it brought with it severe drought, forcing her family, friends and the rest of inhabitants had to quickly migrate to different area with water but on the way she gets lost and hads to city where she tries to become a singer.

Cast 
 Huma Akbar as Sukhaan
 Rahat Kazmi as Gul Muhammad Khan
 Bushra Ansari as Sajida
 Talat Hussain as Tofeeq Ahmed
 Ubaida Ansari as Chanal
 Mehmood Siddiqui as Ali Nawaz Khan
 Mazhar Ali as Mansoor
 Malak Anokha as Munshi Muhabbat Khan
 Nisar Qadri as Janu
 Yaqoob Zakria as Mithan
 Sultan Khan as Police Inspector
 Talat Iqbal as Mehmood
 Manzoor Murad as Muhammad Khan
 Imtiaz Niazi as Police Inspector
 Latif Kapadia as Producer
 Arshad Hussain as Rauf
 Saleem Khan as Allah Dad
 Wakeel Farooqi as Editor
 Subhani Ba Yunus as Editor
 Qazi Wajid as Journalist
 Yar Muhammad Shah as Thanedar

Awards and nominations

References

External links 
 

1980s Pakistani television series
Pakistan Television Corporation original programming
Pakistani drama television series
Urdu-language television shows